The Civil Engineering and Development Department (CEDD) is a department of the Hong Kong government that reports to the Development Bureau. Its major services include provision of land and infrastructure, port and marine services, geotechnical services and environment and sustainability services.

Organisation
The department has a headquarters, 2 functional offices (the Civil Engineering Office and the Geotechnical Engineering Office) and 5 regional development offices (the Sustainable Lantau Office, the East Development Office, the South Development Office, the West Development Office and the North Development Office).

History
The department was formed on 1 July 2004 through a merger of the Civil Engineering Department and the Territory Development Department. The CEDD formerly came under the (former) Environment, Transport and Works Bureau.

Mining Division

In 1951 in the Mining Section was created by the Labour Department, which was then transferred to the Civil Engineering Services Department in 1991 with it eventually renamed as the Mining Division.

See also
 Mining in Hong Kong

References

External links 

 

Hong Kong government departments and agencies
Hong Kong
2004 establishments in Hong Kong